San Damiano al Colle is a comune (municipality) in the Province of Pavia in the Italian region Lombardy, located about 45 km southeast of Milan and about 20 km southeast of Pavia. As of 31 December 2004, it had a population of 767 and an area of 6.4 km².

San Damiano al Colle borders the following municipalities: Bosnasco, Castel San Giovanni, Montù Beccaria, Rovescala.

Demographic evolution

References

Cities and towns in Lombardy